My Way is a compilation album by Eddie Cochran, posthumously released in 1964 in the UK. The album has never been released in the United States.

Track listing

 "My Way" (Capehart/Cochran) 
 "Little Angel" (Winn) 
 "Eddie's Blues"
 "Love Again" (Sheeley) 
 "I Almost Lost My Mind" (Hunter) 
 "Jam Sandwich"
 "Little Lou" (Capehart/Cochran) 
 "Blue Suede Shoes"
 "Hammy Blues"
 "My Love to Remember"
 "Milk Cow Blues"
 "Guybo" (Capehart/Cochran)
 "Long Tall Sally"

Personnel
 Eddie Cochran - Vocals, guitar, bass guitar, drums
 session musicians

Additional notes
Catalogue: (LP) Liberty 1205

External links
 My Way at Allmusic.com

References

Eddie Cochran albums
1964 compilation albums
Liberty Records compilation albums